Common Building Block (CBB) was a set of technical standards for laptop components introduced by Intel in 2005, and adopted by some manufacturers, including Asus, Compal, and Quanta.

Creation
In 2004, the Common Building Block program promoted the use of industry-accepted mechanical and electrical specifications for three notebook components: 14.1-inch, 15-inch, and 15.4-inch liquid crystal displays (LCDs); 9.5mm and 12.7mm optical disc drives (ODDs); and 2.5-inch hard disk drives (HDDs). The program consisted of:
A Web site to provide a centralized repository of information about the program, participants, and platform and ingredient specifications
A continually updated list of CBB-compliant ingredients (submitted by suppliers)
A testing and verification service for candidate products

The defunct repository site mobileformfactors.org was established to standardize components, and included:
Hard disk drives
Optical disc drives
Liquid crystal display panels
Battery packs
AC/DC power adapters
Keyboards
Customizable notebook panels

References

Common Building Block Specifications
Intel pushes for conformity in notebooks
Intel looks to attract leading notebook vendors for CBB initiative, 17 oct 2006

Intel products
Laptops
Standards